The 1920 U.S. National Championships (now known as the US Open) was a tennis tournament that took place on the outdoor grass courts at the West Side Tennis Club, Forest Hills in New York City and the Philadelphia Cricket Club in Chestnut Hill, Philadelphia. The men's tournament, held in New York City, ran from August 30 until September 6, 1920, while the women's event in Chestnut Hill was held from September 20 through September 25, 1920. It was the 40th staging of the U.S. National Championships and the third Grand Slam tennis event of the year.

Finals

Men's singles

 Bill Tilden defeated  Bill Johnston  6–1, 1–6, 7–5, 5–7, 6–3

Women's singles

 Molla Bjurstedt Mallory defeated  Marion Zinderstein  6–3, 6–1

Men's doubles
 Bill Johnston /  Clarence Griffin defeated  Roland Roberts /  Willis Davis 6–2, 6–2, 6–3

Women's doubles
 Marion Zinderstein /  Eleanor Goss defeated  Eleanor Tennant /  Helen Baker 13–11, 4–6, 6–3

Mixed doubles
 Hazel Wightman /  Wallace Johnson defeated  Molla Bjurstedt Mallory /  Craig Biddle 6–4, 6–3

References

External links
Official US Open website
Overleigh Mansion: "Big Bill" Tilden

 
U.S. National Championships
U.S. National Championships (tennis) by year
U.S. National Championships (tennis)
U.S. National Championships
U.S. National Championships
U.S. National Championships